Xu Zhiyong (born March 2, 1973) is a Chinese civil rights activist and formerly a lecturer at the Beijing University of Post and Telecommunications. He was one of the founders of the NGO Open Constitution Initiative and an active rights lawyer in China who campaigned against corruption and helped those underprivileged. He is the main founder and icon of the New Citizens' Movement in China.  In January 2014 he was sentenced to four years in prison for "gathering crowds to disrupt public order". He was detained again on February 15, 2020, in the southern city of Guangzhou after two months in hiding, for his participation in a meeting of rights activists and lawyers in Xiamen in December 2019 in which "democratic transition in China" was discussed.

Personal life
Xu was born in Minquan County, Henan Province in 1973. He was married to Cui Zheng, a journalist. Their daughter was born on January 13, 2014, while Xu was in a detention center facing trial. He had been in hiding since late 2019 and was detained by Chinese police on February 15, 2020. In March of 2021, his partner Li Qiaochu was reported to have been arrested for tweeting that Xu and another activist had been tortured while in detention.

Career and activism
Xu received his Bachelor of Law degree from Lanzhou University in 1994 and Doctor of Law degree from Peking University in 2002.

The Gongmeng era
In 2003, he was elected to the Haidian District People's Congress as an independent. He won the re-election in 2006. In the 2011 election, Xu's name was pulled off the candidate list, but he still gathered more than 3,500 votes out of 22,000 voters in his district.

Xu helped found the public interest group Gongmeng, also known as the Open Constitution Initiative.

Unlike other human rights activists, Xu firmly and carefully pushed his calls for political change and social justice in existing laws, and his group has been regarded as relatively cautious and conservative. In his recent interview before his arrest, he described his dream as follows:

Xu's final remarks post trial also made rounds within Chinese dissident communities abroad in which he described goal of the New Citizens' Movement as follows:

The 2009 Gongmeng incident
On July 29, 2009, he was arrested at his home, and detained by Chinese authorities on charges of tax evasion. At the same time Xu's colleague Zhuang Lu was also arrested by authorities.

The Open Constitution Initiative was fined 1.46 million RMB on July 14, 2009 for 'dodging taxes' and was shut down by the authorities by declaring it "illegal".

Xu Zhiyong was released on bail on August 23, 2009. The Australian newspaper The Age reported that the release of Xu, Zhuang and another Chinese dissident, Ilham Tohti, was in part due to pressure on Beijing from the administration of American President Barack Obama.

Post-Gongmeng era, New Citizens' Movement
After Gongmeng was shut down, Xu Zhiyong and supporters adopted the name "Citizens" to continue their cause. In May 2012, Xu formally established the "New Citizens' Movement" and "New Citizens' Spirit" as the high-level concept of their activism.

In 2013, Xu was placed under house arrest for more than three months, before being formally arrested on August 22. His trial started on January 22, 2014. Xu and his lawyer Zhang Qingfang remained silent throughout the trial (except for his closing statement) to protest the violation of basic legal procedure. Xu's closing statement was cut short by the judge, but the text was circulated on the internet  and raised tremendous support. On January 26, Xu was sentenced to four years in prison for "gathering crowds to disrupt public order". Prior to the verdict, whose date had been expected, lawyer Zhang said about the case: "We can say it was decided even before the trial."

2020 arrest
Xu and other human rights activists were wanted by police for their participation in a meeting in Xiamen on December 13, 2019 where "democratic transition in China" was discussed. In February 2020, while in hiding, through postings on social media, Xu publicly asked Chinese Communist Party general secretary Xi Jinping to resign, for what he described as an obvious inability to handle the COVID-19 pandemic. He was arrested in Guangzhou on February 15, 2020, according to two fellow activists.

In November 2021, Liang Xiaojun, the lawyer of Xu, had his license cancelled by authorities, with the notification letter citing his online support for  Falun Gong and "vilifying" the Chinese constitution and laws. Liang said he had spoken a day earlier via video chat with Xu, who according to Liang was in good health and unshaken in his dissident convictions.

On June 13, 2022, the Intermediate People’s Court of Linyi issued a notice of a pretrial meeting scheduled for June 17. Lawyers and a rights group said on June 17 that Xu would stand trial for "subversion" on June 22. He had been indicted on that charge in August 2021, and there had been no information about him since.

Prominent writings and speeches
 Xu Zhiyong's closing statement in court (January 22, 2014) Chinese English (translated by ChinaChange.org)
 The Last Ten Years, China's rights movement through the work of Gong Meng. Chinese English (translated by ChinaChange.org)
 A trip to Ngaba, (the Tibetan prefecture in Northern Sichuan province where many Tibetans have self-immolated over the last four years or so. A shorter version of the essay was published in the New York Times in December 2012). Chinese English (translated by ChinaChange.org)
 New Citizens' Movement, a "manifesto" published on May 29, 2012. Chinese English(translated by ChinaChange.org)
 To Build a Free China: A Citizen's Journey, Lynne Rienner Publishers, Boulder, Colorado, 2017.

Awards
 Foreign Policy – Top 100 Global Thinkers, 2013
 PEN America – PEN/Barbey Freedom to Write Award, 2020. Xu's partner Li Qiaochu, also an activist, accepted the award on his behalf in December 2020.

See also
Weiquan movement
New Citizens' Movement (China)

References

External links
 

1973 births
Living people
People from Shangqiu
Independent politicians in the People's Republic of China
Chinese human rights activists
Chinese dissidents
Weiquan movement
Chinese prisoners and detainees
Prisoners and detainees of the People's Republic of China
Lanzhou University alumni
Peking University alumni